Kim Hyun-seok (김현석) may refer to:

 Kim Hyun-seok (footballer) (born 1967), South Korean footballer
 Kim Hyun-seok (filmmaker) (born 1972), South Korean filmmaker